Echeng District is one of the three administrative districts into which the prefecture-level city of Ezhou, China's Hubei province, is divided. The district is quite small, and includes Ezhou's main urban area (i.e., in informal terms, Ezhou "city proper") and its eastern and southern suburbs.

Geography

Administrative divisions
As of 2018, Echeng District administered:

Transport

Airport
Ezhou Huahu Airport (opened on 17 July 2022)

Railway
Ezhou railway station
Ezhou East railway station
Huahu railway station

References

County-level divisions of Hubei
Ezhou